Yaftal Sufla is one of the 29 districts of Badakhshan province in eastern Afghanistan.  It was created in 2005 from part of the  Fayzabad District and is home to approximately 58,626 residents.

See also
Fayzabad district

References

External links
Map at the Afghanistan Information Management Services

Districts of Badakhshan Province